Jupiter Ghosh (born 22 July 1989) is a Bangladeshi first-class and List A cricketer.  A right-handed batsman and right-arm medium. Ghosh is an all-rounder and plays as a right-handed batsman. He currently is playing for Khulna Division.He was born in Bagerhat, Khulna. He has played for Sylhet Royals in the Bangladesh Premier League.

References

External links
 
 

1989 births
Living people
Bangladeshi cricketers
People from Khulna